The AACTA Award for Best Actress in a Supporting Role is an accolade given by the Australian Academy of Cinema and Television Arts (AACTA), a non-profit organisation whose aim is to "identify, award, promote, and celebrate Australia's greatest achievements in film and television".

The award is handed out at the annual AACTA Awards, which rewards achievements in feature film, television, documentaries, and short films. From 1976 to 2010, the category was presented by the Australian Film Institute (AFI), the Academy's parent organisation, at the annual Australian Film Institute Awards (known as the AFI Awards). When the AFI launched the Academy in 2011, it changed the annual ceremony to the AACTA Awards, with the current award being a continuum of the AFI Award for Best Actress in a Supporting Role.

Toni Collette and Judy Davis are the most awarded actresses in this category, with three wins each. Candidates for this award must be human and female, and cannot be nominated in the leading actress category for the same role in the same production.

Winners and nominees

References

External links
 Official website of the Australian Academy of Cinema and Television Arts

A
AACTA Award winners
Film awards for supporting actress